Hampshire Township is located in the northwest corner of Kane County, Illinois. As of the 2010 census, its population was 7,569 and it contained 2,926 housing units.

Geography

The Village of Hampshire is located in the township.

Demographics

References
 

Townships in Kane County, Illinois
Townships in Illinois